The Nocturne in E flat major may refer to:

Nocturnes Op. 9 (Chopin) by Frédéric Chopin (the most well-known)
Nocturnes Op. 55 (Chopin) by Frédéric Chopin